Port Albert was the original terminus station on the South Gippsland railway line, the railway opening to that station on 13 January 1892.

Early survey documents regard the station site as "Palmerston" station ground. 

It closed during the 1940s.

References

Disused railway stations in Victoria (Australia)
Transport in Gippsland (region)
Shire of Wellington